The 1950 NCAA Golf Championship was the 12th annual NCAA-sanctioned golf tournament to determine the individual and team national champions of men's collegiate golf in the United States.

The tournament was held at the University of New Mexico Golf Course in Albuquerque, New Mexico.

Defending champions North Texas State again won the team title, the Eagles' second NCAA team national title.

Individual results

Individual champion
 Fred Wampler, Purdue

Tournament medalist
 Arnold Palmer, Wake Forest (138)

Team results

Note: Top 10 only
DC = Defending champions

References

NCAA Men's Golf Championship
Golf in New Mexico
NCAA Golf Championship
NCAA Golf Championship
NCAA Golf Championship